Adam Michael McGurk (born 24 January 1989) is a Northern Irish professional footballer who currently plays for Stratford Town as a forward.

McGurk started his career in the Aston Villa youth academy in 2004, but failed to break into the first team, and joined Hednesford Town on a free transfer in March 2010. Having made twelve appearances for Hednesford, he signed for Tranmere Rovers in August 2010, making 79 league appearances in three years, before being released by the club in July 2013. He joined Morecambe on a free transfer on 31 August 2017.

Career

Aston Villa
Born in Moneymore, Northern Ireland, McGurk was signed by Aston Villa in 2004 from Larne Youth. He was impressive for Aston Villa Reserves in the 2006–07 season, making seven appearances (four of which were from the substitutes bench) and scoring four goals. He suffered a serious knee injury and was out injured for a long time period. After making his comeback he struggled to force his way back into the Aston Villa Reserves and become a regular again. He was released by Villa in early 2010, and briefly retired from professional football.

Hednesford Town
After being released by Aston Villa, he went on trial with Cheltenham Town, but was not offered a contract. He joined Hednesford Town on 11 March 2010. His debut for the club came on 23 March when he played against Truro City in a Southern Football League Premier Division match.

Tranmere Rovers
He then made a couple of trial appearances for Tranmere Rovers during the summer and trained with the squad. He was then given a second chance with the club after he was signed on non-contract basis so he would be named on the substitute's bench for a League Cup first round match against Walsall in August. He made his debut for Rovers on 21 August 2010 in the Football League One clash with Bournemouth which ended in a 3–0 home defeat at Prenton Park, coming on as a second-half substitute for Ian Thomas-Moore. Three days later he signed a one-year contract with Tranmere. He went on to score his first goal for Tranmere in the reverse fixture against Bournemouth on 9 April 2011, scoring a 94th-minute winner. At the end of the 2010–11 season he offered a new contract by the club which he signed in late May, keeping him at Tranmere until summer 2012. The club took up a further one year option on him for the 2012–13 season. McGurk suffered a collapsed lung in February 2013, having also injured his hamstring that month. He was released by Tranmere at the end of the season, along with four other players. On 20 July 2013, McGurk scored a goal whilst on trial with Championship side Birmingham City, in a 1–1 draw with Oxford United.

Burton Albion
McGurk signed a two-year contract with Burton Albion on 5 August 2013. He was given the number 20 shirt and made his debut in the league cup tie against Sheffield United. He set up Chris Hussey's first goal in a 2–1 win. McGurk scored the winning goal in Burton's 1–0 win over Premier League team QPR on 28 August 2014.

Portsmouth
McGurk signed a two-year deal with Portsmouth on 24 June 2015, and went on to score on his debut against Derby County in the League Cup First Round on 12 August. He also netted once during the 3–1 victory at Fratton Park against Barnet.

Cambridge United
On 22 July 2016, McGurk signed a two-year deal with League Two side Cambridge United for an undisclosed fee.

Morecambe
On 31 August 2017, McGurk signed with League Two side Morecambe on a free transfer.

He was released by Morecambe at the end of the 2017–18 season.

Nuneaton Borough
Adam signed with Nuneaton Borough in the Conference North Division.

Chorley FC
After leaving Nuneaton, Adam signed with Chorley on 12 January 2019.

Coalville Town
On 22 June 2019, Adam joined Coalville Town on a 1-year contract.

Stratford Town
On 12 November 2021 he signed for Southern Football League Premier Division Central side Stratford Town.

Career statistics

Club

International career
McGurk has U16 and U17 caps and has also represented Northern Ireland at U21 level, making his debut on 11 August 2009 against Portugal. He was called up to the senior squad in early 2013 for pre-World Cup qualifying friendly matches, but has yet to make his debut.

References

External links

1989 births
Living people
People from Larne
Association footballers from Northern Ireland
Northern Ireland under-21 international footballers
Association football wingers
Aston Villa F.C. players
Hednesford Town F.C. players
Tranmere Rovers F.C. players
Burton Albion F.C. players
Portsmouth F.C. players
Cambridge United F.C. players
Morecambe F.C. players
Chorley F.C. players
Coalville Town F.C. players
Stratford Town F.C. players
English Football League players
Southern Football League players